The 1975 edition of the Campeonato Carioca kicked off on February 20, 1975 and ended on August 17, 1975. It was organized by FCF (Federação Carioca de Futebol, or Carioca Football Federation). Twelve teams participated. Fluminense won the title for the 22nd time. no teams were relegated.

System
The tournament would be divided in four stages:
 Taça Guanabara: The twelve teams all played in a single round-robin format against each other. The champions qualified to the Final phase.
 Taça Augusto Pereira da Motta: The twelve teams all played in a single round-robin format against each other. The champions qualified to the Final phase. The eight best teams qualified to the Third round.
 Taça Danilo Leal Carneiro: The remaining eight teams all played in a single round-robin format against each other. The champions qualified to the Final phase.
Final phase: The three stage winners played in a single round-robin format against each other. the team with the most points won the title.

Championship

Taça Guanabara

Playoffs

Taça Augusto Pereira da Motta

Taça Danilo Leal Carneiro

Playoffs

Final phase

Top Scorer

References

Campeonato Carioca seasons
Carioca